Erie Aerodrome  is a privately owned public-use airport located one nautical mile (2 km) southwest of the central business district of Erie, in Monroe County, Michigan, United States.

Facilities and aircraft 
Erie Aerodrome covers an area of 29 acres (12 ha) at an elevation of 605 feet (184 m) above mean sea level. It has one runway designated 18/36 with a turf surface measuring 2,670 by 80 feet (814 x 24 m).

For the 12-month period ending December 31, 2008, the airport had 200 general aviation aircraft operations, an average of 17 per month. At that time there were 4 aircraft based at this airport: 50% single-engine and 50% ultralight.

Current usage 
As of January 2017, the airport is not in use and is most likely abandoned. Airnav data for the airport has M84 not listed, along with the FAA registry not listing M84 as an active facility as of January 5, 2017.

References

External links 
 Erie Aerodrome (M84) page from Michigan DOT airport directory
 Aerial image as of April 2000 from USGS The National Map

Airports in Michigan
Airports in Monroe County, Michigan
Defunct airports in Michigan